Miss Europe 1965 was the 28th edition of the Miss Europe pageant and the 17th edition under the Mondial Events Organization. It was held at the Palais de la Méditerranée in Nice, France on June 6, 1965. Juliana Herm of Germany, was crowned Miss Europe 1965 by out going titleholder Elly Konie Koot of Holland.

Results

Placements

Contestants 

 - Carin Ingberg Schmidt
 - Lucy Emilie Nossent
 - Yvonne Hanne Ekman
 - Jennifer Warren Gurley
 - Virpi Liisa Miettinen
 - Christiane Sibellin
 - Juliana Herm
 - Evgenia Ksagorari (Xagorari)
 - Anja (Maria) Schuit
 - Sigrún Vignisdóttir
 - Mairead Cullen
 - Anna Maria De Melgazzi
 - Marie-Anne Geisen
 - Britt Aaberg
 - Alicia Borrás
 - Ingrid Norrman
 - Yvette Revelly
 - Mürüvvet Seyfioğlu

Notes

Returns

References

External links 
 

Miss Europe
1965 beauty pageants
1965 in France